Kamran Shokrisalari is a Paralympian athlete from Iran competing mainly in F42 classification throwing events.

Athletics history
Shokrisalari represented Iran at the 2012 Summer Paralympics in London, where he entered the F42 javelin throw event. In the javelin, Shokrisalari second round throw of 52.06 metres was a personal best, and this placed him in first place for much of the competition; only for him to see lead snatched by a new world record by China's Fu Yanlong in his final throw. Shokrisalari took silver, his first Paralympic medal.

Personal history
Shokrisalari was born in Andimeshk, Iran.

Notes

Paralympic athletes of Iran
Athletes (track and field) at the 2012 Summer Paralympics
Paralympic silver medalists for Iran
Living people
Medalists at the 2012 Summer Paralympics
Iranian male javelin throwers
People from Andimeshk
Year of birth missing (living people)
Paralympic medalists in athletics (track and field)
Sportspeople from Khuzestan province
21st-century Iranian people
Medalists at the 2010 Asian Para Games
Paralympic javelin throwers